Hinchwick is a small village in Gloucestershire, England at .

Hinchwick Manor was built by architect Charles Robert Cockerell in 1826.

References

External links

Villages in Gloucestershire